Roy Danforth, Jr. (born 12 Jan 1936), a native of Summitville, Indiana, was the head basketball coach at Syracuse from 1968 to 1976. During his tenure, he compiled a 148–71 (.676) record. In his final four years as a coach, his teams went to the NCAA tournament, including an appearance in the Final Four in 1975. He was credited with rebuilding the Syracuse program, and gave the Orange a terrific home-court advantage. He played college basketball at Southern Mississippi where he scored over 1,000 points and was a 75% career free-throw shooter.

Danforth left Syracuse to succeed Charles Moir at Tulane on April 5, 1976. He signed a three-year contract with a $30,000 annual salary. He was replaced at Syracuse by Jim Boeheim two days prior on April 3. He announced on February 16, 1981 his resignation as Green Wave head coach at the conclusion of the season. He stayed at the university as its assistant athletic director. He was replaced as head coach by Ned Fowler on March 17, 1981. Following his tenure at Tulane, Danforth accepted the athletic director position at Fairleigh Dickinson University.

Head coaching record

See also
 List of NCAA Division I Men's Final Four appearances by coach

References

External links
Roy Danforth's profile

1936 births
Living people
American men's basketball players
Basketball coaches from Indiana
Basketball players from Indiana
College men's basketball head coaches in the United States
People from Madison County, Indiana
Southern Miss Golden Eagles basketball players
Syracuse Orange men's basketball coaches
Tulane Green Wave men's basketball coaches